The Jesus Christians are a Christian millennialist network of communes on five different continents. They occasionally do volunteer work, are frequently active politically, and regularly distribute Christian comics, books, pamphlets, and DVDs. Most of their publications are written by their co-founder, Dave McKay. They were founded in Australia in 1981 by Dave and Cherry Mckay and have had a three-decade-long history of controversy documented extensively by the media. Their core beliefs are based on the teachings of Jesus with special emphasis on his decree from the Sermon on the Mount, that his followers "cannot serve God and money".

Since disbanding in 2010, the group has operated under many different names. The different bases of the new organisation began experimenting with making YouTube videos as a way of disseminating their message. As early as 2012, a base in South America started a YouTube channel, called Como Vivir Por Fe ("How to Live by Faith"). A website of the same name appeared around the same time. For several years, Como Vivir Por Fe only made Spanish translations of sermons by American evangelist, Francis Chan. However, in 2015, the South American base started producing their own material, including a 45-minute documentary about Microchip Implants being the Mark of the Beast. In 2016, "disbanded" Jesus Christian bases from around the world started to contribute videos to another YouTube channel, called End Time Survivors. The channel featured anonymous presenters whose faces were digitally altered or concealed with a mask. The only named presenter was "Brother Dave". Through this forum, Dave McKay, who had previously only preached through print, began experimenting with delivering online sermons. Non-members were also allowed to post videos, as long as they shared similar views on Bible prophecy. An End Time Survivors website was also created in 2016.

A more successful channel, A Voice in the Desert, was created in October 2016 by the Australian base. It predominantly featured sermons, accompanied by animated illustrations, on a broad range of Christian topics usually delivered by Dave, but not always. In May 2020, A Voice in the Desert channel had chalked up 104,000 subscribers and over 13 million views. The group, which had been limited to about 30 members worldwide, reported a dramatic increase in numbers after starting its video ministry in 2016.

In 2019, the group was profiled for inclusion in the World Religions and Spirituality Project, which provides independent comprehensive insight into the group, its beliefs and history.

History and controversies

The history and activities of the Jesus Christians over the years have been extensively documented by both the group and the mainstream media, attracting both positive and negative attention. Some older newspaper articles were reproduced on the group's website, and where these are used below this is noted in the references.

Early days

The group was started in Melbourne, Australia, by Dave and Cherry McKay when Neville Williams moved in with the Mckay family in early 1981. David Mckay was a former member of the Children of God and left following the revelation of heretical practices such as flirty fishing. The Jesus Christians operated under several different names, including Christians; The Medowie Christian Volunteers; Australian Christian Volunteers, and Voices in the Wilderness. The name 'Jesus Christians' was selected in 1996. ("A Change of Name", August, 1996)

Free work
In 1983 Australian media followed members of the community who offered to do free work for one day for any
family or business which requested their assistance.

Money burning
In 1984 group member Boyd Ellery was sentenced to three months prison in Sydney for burning an Australian dollar note in a statement about trusting God and not money. The protest was broadcast on national television by Mike Willisee.

Messages with money
In January 1985 the group glued Australian $2 notes to pavements to spell out messages against greed and money outside post offices around Victoria and New South Wales.

Christian messages also appeared written on a claimed AUS$100,000 worth of $2 notes in Sydney. The group claimed that as a result the federal police confiscated their mail until the Council for Civil Liberties intervened.

Nullarbor Walk

In May and June 1985, six of the youngest members of the community, 12-year-old Rachel Sukamaran, Malcolm Wrest, Roland Gianstefani, Robin Dunn and Gary McKay, headed by 15-year-old Christine McKay, walked 1,000 miles across the Nullarbor Desert in the interior of Australia without taking any money, provisions or support vehicle for their journey, prompting controversy and media interest. A book based on the diaries of the Nullarbor Walkers was published in 1985, by John Sands, shortly after the walk was completed.  An Easy English version of the diaries was later published by New Century Book House (India) and then Smashwords.

Fall of America prophecy
In 1990, members of the group travelled to the United States to hand out 290,000 booklets entitled "The Fall of America" prophesying America's destruction. They wore T-shirts with an upside down American flag (as a symbol of distress) and the caption "Pride Goeth Before a Fall"

India
In 1994, Rob and Christine Dunn, Gary, Dave & Cherry McKay, Ross Parry, Rachel Sukamaran, Malcolm Wrest, Craig, Kevin, Rols, Sue, Sinni, Liz, Boyd, Chris, Roshini, and Sheri were among Jesus Christian members who voluntarily cleaned sewers and toilets in India. After one protest where members stood in the sewer for a week to draw attention to the filth that spread disease, Craig Hendry contracted typhoid.

In 1995 the Jesus Christians converted a section of open sewer in Chennai into a children's playground. The real estate created by covering the sewer was estimated to be worth AUD $950,000. After one year the project was handed over to Indian charities to run, however the Indian government eventually demolished the site because it had been built on government land without permission.

Nappy Chappies / Children of God
In April 1997 and 1998 several Jesus Christians were arrested at the Royal Easter Show in Sydney dressed as babies in over-sized nappies while distributing "The Baby Books", highlighting how Jesus said his followers need to become like children to enter into God's Kingdom. The introduction of the books stated "We are children of God" which led to confusion about the group being the same as the Children of God group started by David Berg of the same name. This continuing confusion can be seen in a 2013 article which uses a photograph of the "Nappy Chappies" labelled as the Children of God.

Split
In 1998 there was a split in the community. Craig and Yesamma Hendry and their family, Kevin and Elisabeth McKay, Boyd and Sheri Ellery and their family, Darren and Donna Cooke, Ray Sippel, Josh and Tim left the community in Australia. Boyd wrote to the remaining community "The Spirit you are following is not Christ's. We will have no part of your hierarchies and fleshly importance." The remaining community were "encouraged to avoid private correspondence or discussions with them..."

Kyri and Berni Sheridan
In July 1999, 19-year-old Kyri Sheridan joined the Jesus Christians in the UK. His mother reported him missing to the Guildford Police in Surrey. Kyri (accompanied by fellow Jesus Christian Francisco Gonzales) signed in at the Guildford police station to state that he was not actually "missing". The police confirmed Kyri was happy and making his own decision to be with the Jesus Christians. When his mother held Kyri to stop him from leaving she was pinned down, handcuffed and arrested by the police.

2000-2010

Bobby Kelly controversy
On 14 July 2000 the group was splashed across the front page of the British tabloid Daily Express, which declared that members Susan and Roland Gianstefani had kidnapped a 16-year-old boy, Bobby Kelly. Bobby had picked up a Jesus Christians cartoon book called The Liberator in Romford High Street, Essex, near the end of June 2000, and gone home to tell his grandmother about the Christian man he met. Bobby went out again that afternoon and returned to tell his grandmother he wanted to join the Jesus Christians. A few days later "an Australian couple with their young son, a German and two English men" from the group visited and met Bobby's grandmother. In the first two weeks of July while Bobby was with the group, before the scandal had hit the headlines, Bobby visited his youth worker from St. Peters Anglican Church in Harold Wood. He had previously attended that church. The youth worker, David Whitehouse, told the press a week later, "The group has a veneer of respectability, but there is something very disturbing about them. When I saw Bobby a week ago, he was with three of them, and he seemed very scared, which was unlike him".

Sometime before July 14, anti-cult expert, Graham Baldwin, was reportedly contacted by "someone close to the family who suspected that something was wrong, and did something to try to save him." It has not been established that David Whitehouse was the person who contacted him. Baldwin worked for a charity, Catalyst, which helps families of people caught up in groups with whom the family disagrees. A solicitor who "specialises in cases against cults" was hired after legal aid was acquired and the solicitor succeeded in getting an emergency High Court action to try to "rescue the schoolboy". The front page newspaper report in The Express was published two weeks after Bobby first met the Jesus Christians with the story that Bobby had "disappeared" after he met the group: "Within hours Bobby had forsaken his possessions and moved in with the group. The police were called and the airports and docks were put on the highest alert." After The Express broke the story, instead of handing the boy over to the police, the Jesus Christians with Bobby "in tow" panicked went "on the run". The UK Jesus Christians became fugitives for two weeks.

When the Jesus Christians could not be found in the nationwide search, and when Bobby started doing telephone interviews with the media declaring that he had not been kidnapped, an emergency court ruling was made banning the broadcast of interviews with Bobby or the group, which the BBC successfully challenged. Bobby was eventually located hiding out with two Jesus Christian men, including Reinhard Zeuner, in a Hampshire forest, and placed in a foster home. No members of the Jesus Christians were charged with kidnapping but a charge of contempt of court (for failing to answer questions from the High Court judge) resulted in six-month sentences for Susan and Roland Gianstefani. The solicitor for the Gianstefani's told the court that the Gianstefani's feared Bobby might be subjected to the deprogramming of his religious beliefs if they had revealed his whereabouts. Minutes before the Gianstefanis were due to be sentenced, Bobby, who was kept in a separate room at the High Court, sent a note to the judge through the representative of the Official Solicitor saying that the Gianstefani's had acted nobly and they feared he (Bobby) might be subjected to the deprogramming of his religious beliefs if they had revealed his whereabouts. Bobby said: "I hope they don't get into trouble. They were willing to go to prison for me." The Gianstefanis' sentences were suspended after Bobby had pleaded with the judge in their defence.

Kidney donations
Over half of the Jesus Christian members donated a kidney to people they did not know prior to agreeing to donate, thus earning them the nickname 'the kidney cult'.

In January 2003, Jon Ronson's documentary called Kidneys for Jesus aired on Channel 4 in the UK. After an invitation from Dave McKay, Jon Ronson followed the group over a year as they attempted to donate their kidneys to strangers in the UK and the US. The successful donations of members Casey Crouch, Robin Dunn and Susan Gianstefani are featured. The film also documents the tension that arose between Ronson and McKay during filming: McKay became increasingly concerned that Ronson was portraying the Jesus Christians in a poor light and Ronson was concerned about McKay's ideas to try to manipulate a media storm around the donations as well as his role in the decisions made by members to donate kidneys.

In 2004 the group made headlines in Australia when the leader, David Mckay, revealed that members in Australia had lied to health authorities in order to be able to donate their kidneys. David Mckay later admitted it was his teaching that if you must lie, be honest about your dishonesty.

In June 2008, the Australian Broadcasting Corporation broadcast a report on Ash Falkingham's fight for his right to donate a kidney to a stranger. The documentary covers the attempts of his parents to thwart the young Jesus Christian's intentions and his final success. Ash left the community shortly afterwards to work restoring bicycles for a charity.

Kenya abduction charges

In 2005 a charge of abduction was made against Roland and Susan Gianstefani in Kenya, this time by the father of a 27-year-old single mother, Betty Njoroge, who had joined the community with her 7-year-old son. The woman released a video on the group's website declaring that she and her son had not been kidnapped and that her father was responsible for the case being pursued as he wanted custody of her son. Roland Gianstefani was arrested and questioned by police and held for several days without charge, until the Australian embassy insisted he be charged or else released. Roland and his wife Susan were charged and Roland was held in a remand prison in Nairobi until 600,000 Kenyan shillings bail was paid. The charges against him and Susan were dropped when Betty Njoroge appeared in court and presented an affidavit confirming she was acting of her own free will. Roland contracted tuberculosis in prison and Susan, who had earlier told the media that she and her husband would never stoop to bribery, not even to save their lives, claimed she had to resort to bribery to get basic amenities provided for Roland from the prison guards.

Californian whipping trial

In October 2006 Jesus Christians in the United States, along with Dave and Cherry McKay, held a mock trial in Long Beach, California where they charged the parents and two brothers of one of their members, Joseph Johnson, with attempted murder and with aiding and abetting others in doing this. It followed an attack on one of their members, Reinhard Zeuner, in which he received a fractured spine, bleeding on the brain, broken teeth and numerous cuts to the head and face. An amateur video was made of the attack, but the police never prosecuted the case. Although the family did not attend the trial, various sentences of 5-25 lashes of the whip were carried out on volunteers from the Jesus Christians themselves, as an attempt to illustrate their understanding of the cross of Christ. "God hates the sin, but loves the sinner", they said, in an effort to summarize what they were doing. ("The Trial")

The Jeremy Kyle Show
On 11 December 2007, Dave and Cherry McKay and Roland and Susan Gianstefani were interviewed on stage as part of a two-day feature on religious cults on the UK television programme The Jeremy Kyle Show. The show attempted to link the Jesus Christians with such groups as Jim Jones' People's Temple, and the Children of God. Dave and Cherry and Roland and Sue were questioned by Jeremy Kyle and opponents of David McKay. At one point, due to the nature of the questioning, Dave McKay refused to reply to any more questions and McKay walked out of the interview and then returned to say "Just let them do their thing".

Freeganism and Wife Swap show

In February 2008, Roland, Susan and Daniel Gianstefani were featured on the Channel 4 program Wife Swap, where freegan Susan went to live with the millionaire family of an IT consultant.

Gianstefanis leave, group dispersal claimed by founder.
In August 2010, long term members Roland, Susan and Daniel Gianstefani left the community after "numerous tensions over their parenting skills". This followed "a number of community discussions", according to the Jesus Christians Newsletter. Susan and Roland had been members of the group for more than twenty years.

Roland and Susan Gianstefani, continue to identify as Jesus Christians. Their current ministry is now focused on anti war and human rights activism.

In November 2010 founder David McKay claimed the group has disbanded, graduated or dispersed.
Long-term members Roland and Sue Gianstefani and Ross Parry claim they have been excommunicated at this time from all correspondence with other members at the behest of McKay, for objecting to changes in the dishonest manner in which the group is to operate.
Another member, Alan Wright, is also disfellowshipped from the group for refusing to comply with dictates from the group's leadership regarding not suing his wife for more money in a divorce settlement.

Post 2010

End Time Survivors

Since the founder David Mckay's announcement in 2010 of disbandment, graduation, or dispersal, there is some confusion with regard to the continuing organisation of members of Jesus Christians.

Roland and Susan Gianstefani still identify as Jesus Christians UK, but have been excommunicated by the founder. Evidence that Jesus Christians appear to be operating under the name of End Time Survivors with Dave and Cherry Mckay continuing to lead the group in a more covert form has recently come to light.

In October 2017 Roland and Susan Gianstefani had a live radio interview with Bobby Kelly on a Welsh radio station where they discussed their life and the controversies they were involved in when they were a part of the community now called End Times Survivors, formerly called the Jesus Christians community.

On December 7, 2017, at the annual conference of The Australian Association for the Study of Religion in Sydney, an academic paper was presented with a formal discussion about a new religious movement that was founded in Australia in the 1980s and led by Dave and Cherry McKay. The author, Geraldine Smith, described the movement as a "Christian millennialist group" called the "End Time Survivors (ETS)".
There is evidence that a web site and YouTube channel called "End Time Survivors" appeared in 2015. Several ex-members of the Jesus Christians knew and recognised voices and faces of Jesus Christians long-term members despite minor attempts to digitally obscure their identities. Ex members, Roland and Sue Gianstefani assert that it has been a deliberate long-term plan by David McKay to take the group underground and hide its identity from the public, by presenting the group or groups under different names while claiming loose associations between members living in different locations. They assert that the influence of the founder over these groups and their real identities is to be kept hidden from the public in order to avoid persecution.

"Led by Dave and Cherry Mckay a movement mostly based in Australia but with significant global outreach. This movement derives its guiding ethos from a very particular reading of The Bible that prioritises the teachings of Jesus as an apocalyptic figure."

The EndTime Survivors website contains many identical teachings from the Jesus Christians and promotes David McKay's books Survivors, Armageddon for Beginners and Jesus Christian pamphlets such as Christian But Not Religious as well as many of the Jesus Christians articles from their website. "End Time Survivors" also appears as a Youtube channel and is linked to "Voice in the Desert" with similar topics.

May 2019
Academic writer Geraldine Smith published a shortened excerpt of her longer thesis on the World Religions and Spirituality Project web site, clearly linking Jesus Christians members to both "Voice in the desert" and "End Time survivors" web site and Youtube channels. In this article founder David McKay is quoted as saying that the decision to announce the group had disbanded in 2010 was "both REAL and FAKE" at the same time, and the reason for the group going into hiding (or pretending to have disbanded) was due to internet persecution.

August 2019
"Voice in the desert" YouTube channel finally admitted links to Jesus Christians.

The official website of the Jesus Christians which had been largely dormant for nine years made a front page announcement that the former group has "officially linked up with one another" and that content on the page will be revived with direct links to Voice in the Desert Youtube content. A link to Geraldine Smith's full original thesis was also included as well as the link to the WRSP website This article under the section "imploding in 2010" tried to give some explanation as to why some former members were excommunicated and also included links to criticisms by former senior members and their version of events about that time.

Beliefs and teachings

Obedience to Jesus 
Obedience, as opposed to a kind of "faith" that does not require obedience.

When an individual rejects the teachings of Jesus, they are in fact rejecting God.

Living by faith (and not working for money) 
God will provide the material needs of people who stop working for money, and dedicate their lives to obeying the teachings of Jesus. (21. "A Unique Teaching", circa 1996)

Forsaking all 
Jesus expects his followers to give up all their worldly wealth. ("How to Be Saved")

The secret name of Jesus - the word of God 
Jesus (not the Bible) is the Word of God. Although holy writings may be inspired, they are all fallible. ("The Word of God", Jesus Christians, August, 1995)

The teachings of Jesus, not religious traditions, should be the basis of faith. ("We Believe in Jesus Christ", circa 2000)

Sincerity 
Sincerity as opposed to doctrinal perfection. Non-Christians can be saved on the basis of their faith in God, even if they have never heard of Jesus. This was made possible through the death of Jesus on the cross. See Inclusivism.

Sincerity is more important spiritually than being theologically correct ("The Good Hindu") ("In Search of Truth", November, 1986).

The Mark of The Beast 
The technology needed to implement the "Mark of the Beast" is now in place in the form of microchipped ID cards and subdermal RFID chips.

Economic, technological and political developments are all moving towards a one world government, under the control of The Antichrist.

The world's population will become trapped in a global system of control because they are unable to forsake their attachment to money.

The return of Jesus is likely to occur soon, although not until after the Great Tribulation. ("Signs of the Times," June, 1986)

Christians will judge the world after Jesus returns, and Jesus will reign over the world for a thousand years.

Grievances 
Resolving differences through the grievance system is a very strong teaching within Jesus Christian communities based on Matthew 18:15-17.

Living communally 
Like the early Christians, the Jesus Christians do not have private ownership in their communities (Act 2:44-45, 4:32-35), but share their money and possessions.

Accountability 
Accountability is seen as an important part of everyday life and the responsibility of everyone.

Secret piety 
Based on Matthew 6:1-18, Jesus Christian members pray secretly in accordance with Jesus' teachings. Fasting and giving to the poor is seen in the same light.

Not using titles 
Based on Matt 23:9 where Jesus instructs his followers to "call no man on earth Father", the Jesus Christians refuse to use all titles, including "Mr", "Sir", "Dr' and even "Mom".

Pacifism and non-violence 
Jesus taught "love your enemies" in Luke 6:27. The Jesus Christians teach and try to practice "turning the other cheek" (Matthew 5:38-40).

Celibacy/chastity. 
The Jesus Christians teach that it is better to remain single and that sex is not allowed before marriage.

There are spiritual advantages to remaining single; however marriage is not forbidden even though it is regarded as an inferior option to celibacy.

No divorce and re-marriage. 
Jesus allows for divorce but not for remarriage. The Jesus Christians teach (based on Matt 5:31-32) that if you divorce you are to remain single.

Masturbation. 
There is nothing sinful about masturbation. ("Wanking, the Last Taboo")

Jesus Christians see masturbation as a legitimate way to release sexual tension and the key to remaining celibate.

Water baptism 
Jesus Christians do not believe that water baptism is necessity for salvation, so they leave it up to the individual to decide. The Jesus Christians say that John's Baptism was with water and that he recognised that the real baptism is with the Holy Spirit (Luke 3:16). They understand "The Great Commission" to mean that we "cover" or baptise people with the teachings of Jesus

The Trinity 
Beliefs about the doctrine of the Trinity are of little consequence. ("Father and Son--Two for One", January, 1994)

Practices
Members forsake all private ownership, with the option of either handing over all of their earthly possessions to the Jesus Christian community, or giving it all to charity. ("Forsaking All", from Jesus and Money) The group teaches that all members must have equal say in how funds are to be used. ("Power--Good or Evil", and "Setting Up Your Own Community")

Publications
Survivors is a response to the popular Left Behind series of novels on Bible prophecy, written by Tim LaHaye and Jerry Jenkins. In its own words, Survivors attempts to include material that was left out of the LaHaye-Jenkins series. In 2006 they reported that sales for this book had exceeded one million. Mckay has also published a second book in the series, entitled Listening. It purports to be an "equel" (sic) to Survivors, taking place during the same time period, although from another viewpoint. A third book, also set during the same time period as the first two, is entitled Destroyers. It is also available on the JC website, and was released in paperback form at around Christmas 2008. The story for that mostly takes place in Kenya and is told through the perspective of someone who takes the mark of the beast (Destroyers [2014 Paper back edition] Chapter 17 - "Implanted". Page 98.)

As of 2009, the Jesus Christians had produced several videos, including a documentary expounding on various aspects of their lifestyle. They had also produced several music videos. Their latest videos included a documentary (The Tyrant Within) about the implementation of RFID microchip implants and a video about the justice system, its effect on society and a radical Christian approach to mixing justice with mercy (Beyond Justice).

Books by David McKay
 Without Thought for Food or Clothing 1985  (Also available as "The walk of Faith" on www.smashwords.com).
 Bin Raiders copyright 2000 (also available from the Jesus Christians website)
 Armageddon for Beginners, copyright 1999 . (Also published as Not for Everyone by Anonymous .)
 Survivors, copyright 2002 .
 Strong Meat, copyright 2003 (Note: Articles in the book are contained in the section of the same name, on the Jesus Christian website.)
 Listening, copyright 2008 .
 Destroyers, copyright 2008 .

Jesus Christian pamphlets
Jeremiah's Lament – A modern paraphrase of the Book of Jeremiah.
Christian...but not religious!
Radical Christian Truths. 
Churchianity vs Christianity.

References

External links
 Jesus Christians website - Run by Dave and Cherry McKay
 End Time Survivors website
 A Voice in the Desert YouTube Channel
 World Religions and Spirituality Project

Christianity in Australia
Christian organizations established in 1980
Christian communities
Christian religious orders established in the 20th century